Chalcogenia is a genus of beetles in the family Buprestidae, containing the following species:

 Chalcogenia acaciae Descarpentries & Mateu, 1965
 Chalcogenia argodi Kerremans, 1909
 Chalcogenia bicolor Bily, 2008
 Chalcogenia brevicornis Bily, 2008
 Chalcogenia brevis Bily, 2008
 Chalcogenia chrysobothrina Bily, 2008
 Chalcogenia contempta (Mannerheim, 1837)
 Chalcogenia denticulata (Roth, 1851)
 Chalcogenia elegans Bily, 2008
 Chalcogenia elongata Kerremans, 1912
 Chalcogenia embrikiella Obenberger, 1936
 Chalcogenia femorata Kerremans, 1908
 Chalcogenia funebris Obenberger, 1917
 Chalcogenia gracilis Bily, 2008
 Chalcogenia halperini Volkovitsh & Bily, 1997
 Chalcogenia impressicollis (Fahraeus, 1851)
 Chalcogenia jendeki Bily, 2008
 Chalcogenia lindiana Bily, 2008
 Chalcogenia margotana Novak, 2009
 Chalcogenia martini Abeille de Perrin, 1907
 Chalcogenia natalensis Bily, 2008
 Chalcogenia neavei Burgeon, 1941
 Chalcogenia nigra Bily, 2008
 Chalcogenia pilipes Bily, 2008
 Chalcogenia plana Bily, 2008
 Chalcogenia plicata Bily, 2008
 Chalcogenia pseudoacaciae Bily, 2008
 Chalcogenia strandi Obenberger, 1928
 Chalcogenia sulcipennis (Gory, 1841)
 Chalcogenia suturalis Kerremans, 1891
 Chalcogenia theryi Abeille de Perrin, 1897
 Chalcogenia thoracica Obenberger, 1941
 Chalcogenia toroensis Obenberger, 1931
 Chalcogenia ugandae Thery, 1928
 Chalcogenia ugandana Burgeon, 1941
 Chalcogenia viriditarsis Nonfried, 1892
 Chalcogenia werneri Bily, 2008
 Chalcogenia zabranskyi Bily, 2008

References

Buprestidae genera